

Ghevont Alishan (1820-1901; also spelled Ghevond Alishan, or Leonzio Alishan in Italian or Léonce Alichan in French) was an ordained Armenian Catholic priest, historian and a poet. He was awarded by the Legion of Honour of the French Academy (1866), an honorary member of the Asian Society of Italia, Venice Academy and Archeological Society of Saint-Petersburg.

John Ruskin wrote that he "always looked upon him Padre Alishan as a sort of saint; he has been our friend for a great many of years."

He was a member of the Mekhitarist Congregation on Saint Lazarus Island in Venice beginning in 1838.

In 1885 he created the first modern Armenian flag. His first design was a horizontal tricolor, but with a set of colors different from those used on the Armenian flag of today. The top band would be red to symbolize the first Sunday of Easter (called "Red" Sunday), the green to represent the "Green" Sunday of Easter, and finally an arbitrary color, white, was chosen to complete the combination.  While in France, Alishan also designed a second flag inspired by the national Flag of France. Its colors were red, green, and blue respectively, representing the band of colors that Noah saw after landing on Mount Ararat.

A bust of Alishan, created in 1903 by the sculptor , is displayed in the National Gallery of Armenia.

Gallery

Publications 
 Armenian popular Songs: translated into English by the R. Leo M. Alishan DD. of the Mechitaristic Society, Venice, S. Lazarus, 1852.
 Etude de la patrie: physiographie de l'Arménie: discours prononcé le 12 août 1861 à la distribution annuelle des prix au collège arménien Samuel Moorat, Venise, S. Lazar, 1861.
 «Յուշիկք հայրենեաց հայոց» (Memories of the Armenian Homeland) 1869.
 «Շնորհալի եւ պարագայ իւր» ('Shnorhali ew paragay iwr', Armenian History). 1873, Venice.
 «Շիրակ» (Shirak) 1881.
 Deux descriptions arméniennes des lieux Saints de Palestine, Gènes, 1883.
 «Սիսուան» (Sisouan) 1885.
 «Այրարատ» (Ayrarat) 1890.
 «Սիսական» (Sisakan) 1893.
 «Հայապատում» ('Hayapatum', Armenian History). 1901, Venice.

See also 
 Leonardo Alishan

References

  Armenology Research National Center: THE ARMENIAN BOOK 1512-1920
 Jennifer Manoukian, "Ghevont Alishan," Encyclopedia of Romantic Nationalism in Europe: https://ernie.uva.nl/viewer.p/21/56/object/131-515195

External links 
 
 
 The Evolution of the Armenian Flag

1820 births
1901 deaths
Writers from Istanbul
Mekhitarists
Armenian Catholic priests
Christian clergy from the Ottoman Empire
Armenian male poets
Male poets from the Ottoman Empire
Armenian studies scholars
Armenian educators
Educators from the Ottoman Empire
Armenian lexicographers
Lexicographers from the Ottoman Empire
Armenian geographers
Geographers from the Ottoman Empire
Flag designers
Mount Ararat
Chevaliers of the Légion d'honneur
Members of the Société Asiatique
Academic staff of the Accademia di Belle Arti di Venezia
San Lazzaro degli Armeni alumni
Armenians from the Ottoman Empire
Armenians in Istanbul
Emigrants from the Ottoman Empire to Austria-Hungary
Emigrants from the Ottoman Empire to Italy
19th-century Armenian poets
19th-century Armenian historians
19th-century lexicographers
19th-century male writers
Eastern Catholic poets